Hao Siwen is a fictional character in Water Margin, one of the Four Great Classical Novels in Chinese literature. Nicknamed "Wood Dog of Well", he ranks 41st among the 108 Stars of Destiny and fifth among the 72 Earthly Fiends.

Background
After dreaming of the  "Wood Dog of Well" (a stellar deity who resides in the constellation of Gemini) entering her body, Hao Siwen's mother becomes pregnant and gives birth to him. Believed to be an incarnation of the divinity, Hao is nicknamed the "Wood Dog of Well". Although a skilled warrior, he holds a minor military position in Pudong County (蒲東縣; in present-day Dezhou, Shandong).

Becoming an outlaw
When the outlaws of Liangshan Marsh attack Daming Prefecture to rescue Lu Junyi and Shi Xiu, Grand Secretary Liang Shijie, the governor of Daming, seeks help from the Imperial Tutor Cai Jing, his father-in-law, in the Song imperial capital Dongjing. Xuan Zan, a minor officer under Cai, recommends his friend Guan Sheng, a military inspector in Pudong County, as cut out for the job. With the assent of Cao, Xuan rushes to Pudong, where he finds Guan in his office discussing the rise and fall of past dynasties with his sworn brother Hao Siwen. Guan takes Hao along to the imperial court, where he is tasked with saving Daming and the latter appointed his lieutenant together with Xuan Zan.

Guan Sheng adopts the strategy of attacking Liangshan to force Song Jiang to lift the siege on Daming. Things develop as he has expected. But, in face of many good fighters, Guan finds it a daunting task to squash Liangshan. Huyan Zhuo, a former imperial general who has gone over to Liangshan after failing to conquer the stronghold, comes to Guan one night alone, claiming that his capitulation to the outlaws is a sham. Guan is duped by Huyan to conduct a night raid on the camp of Song Jiang. When he gets there, he is pulled off his horse by hook wielders waiting in ambush and captured. Meanwhile, Xuan Zan is no match for Qin Ming and is seized too. Hao Siwen takes flight facing the formidable Lin Chong and Hua Rong. Hu Sanniang catches up with him, catches him with her lasso and pulls him off his horse. Moved by the warm and kind treatment of Song Jiang, the three transfer their allegiance to Liangshan. 

Informed of Guan Sheng's defection, Cai Jing orders Shan Tinggui and Wei Dingguo, two military instructors based in Lingzhou (凌州; in present-day Dezhou, Shandong), to mount another attack on Liangshan. Guan Sheng volunteers to take the fight to Lingzhou, with Xuan Zan and Hao Siwen as his assistants. In their first clash, Shan Tinggui and Wei Dingguo lure Hao and Xuan respectively into their battle ranks where they are engulfed by soldiers and captured. When Hao and Xuan are on the way being sent to Dongjing for punishment, the bandits of Mount Deadwood under Bao Xu, who is poised to join Liangshan invited by Li Kui, intercept the convoy and rescue them. Led by Li Kui, Hao Siwen, Xuan Zan, Bao Xu and Jiao Ting attack a gate of Lingzhou, causing its fall and the rout of Wei Dingguo's force. Like Shan Tinggui, who is earlier won over by Guan Sheng, Wei gives in to Liangshan when he finds himself cornered.

Campaigns and death
Hao Siwen is appointed as one of the leaders of the Liangshan cavalry after the 108 heroes come together in what is called the Grand Assembly. He participates in the campaigns against the Liao invaders and rebel forces in Song territory following amnesty from Emperor Huizong for Liangshan.

In the siege of Hangzhou in the campaign against Fang La, Hao Siwen and Xu Ning are assigned to watch the north side of the city. A sudden attack by troops charging out from the city surprise them leading to Hao being captured and Xu hit by a poisoned arrow as he tries to save him. Hao Siwen is beheaded and quartered by the enemy general Fang Tianding.

Notes

References
 
 
 
 
 
 
 

72 Earthly Fiends
Fictional characters from Shandong